Rebekha Carina Sharkie ( Che;
born 24 August 1972) is an Australian politician and member of the Centre Alliance party. She is a member of the Australian House of Representatives, representing the Division of Mayo in South Australia. At the 2016 federal election she defeated Liberal Jamie Briggs, and was the first Nick Xenophon Team member to be elected to the Australian House of Representatives. On 11 May 2018, Sharkie resigned from the House of Representatives as a part of the 2017–18 Australian parliamentary eligibility crisis. She contested the 2018 Mayo by-election on 28 July, and was returned to parliament.

Early life and education
Sharkie was born in Torbay, England in 1972 to British and American parents. The family moved to Australia when Sharkie was two years old. She attended Eyensbury Senior College for her high school education and went on to study international relations and public policy at Flinders University. Sharkie became a naturalised Australian on 19 March 2007, and formally renounced her British citizenship in 2016.

Career
Sharkie worked as a paralegal in Darwin and South Australia.

Political life
As a high school student, Sharkie had handed out how-to-vote cards for Australian Democrats Janine Haines. In 2006, she worked as a researcher for then-South Australian Liberal opposition leader Isobel Redmond. In 2008, she worked as an electorate officer for Briggs for six months. She has also worked for South Australian state Liberal MP Rachel Sanderson.

Although she had worked for Liberals for some time, Sharkie did not formally join the party until 2010.  She left it in 2012 when she was appointed the national Executive Officer  Youth Connections. When that program was defunded by the Liberal government at the end of 2014, she became Senior Manager and Head of Donor relations at Helping Young People Achieve (HYPA) a NFP that assists young disadvantaged people in South Australia.

Sharkie considered running for the Liberals in the 2014 state election in the safe seat of Schubert, only to be told that she needed the blessing of federal minister Christopher Pyne and federal senator Cory Bernardi, the highest-ranking federal MPs from the moderate and conservative factions of the SA Liberals, before seeking preselection.  Sharkie told The Australian that when she learned she couldn't stand without the "anointing" of Pyne and Bernardi, she was appalled. She asked, "Are you serious? A branch doesn't choose?"  Combined with her anger at the "ditch the witch" campaign against Julia Gillard, she was thus very receptive when then-independent Senator Nick Xenophon announced he was forming his own party to stand candidates in the upcoming federal election.  Initially serving as a volunteer for the newly-formed Nick Xenophon Team, she ultimately agreed to stand in Mayo.  Although Mayo had been a very safe Liberal seat for most of its existence, polling suggested that if Labor directed its preferences to Sharkie, she could take the seat off the Liberals.

In the 2 July 2016 election, Sharkie defeated her former boss, Briggs, 55% to 45% in the two-party-preferred vote. On the first count, she finished only three percent behind Briggs, who lost over 16 percent of his primary vote from 2013. This allowed her to ultimately defeat Briggs on Labor preferences.

She became the first NXT member of the Australian House of Representatives, joining a cross-bench of five members not aligned to either major party. She is the first woman and the first non-Liberal member to represent Mayo.

On 9 May 2018, Sharkie announced her resignation from the House of Representatives following the High Court of Australia ruling that Senator Katy Gallagher was ineligible to contest the 2016 election as a consequence of the 2017–18 Australian parliamentary eligibility crisis. Like Gallagher, Sharkie had failed to complete renunciation of her British citizenship before nomination in the 2016 federal election. She contested the 2018 Mayo by-election on 28 July, and was returned to parliament with a swing in her favour.

Sharkie successfully defended her Mayo seat in the May 2019 federal election winning her seat with a two party preferred vote of 55.14%, up 2.22% on the previous election.

Sharkie was re-elected in the 2022 Australian federal election with the support of the Teal independents.

Personal
Sharkie is married to Nathan. They live in Birdwood, South Australia. She has three children from a previous marriage which ended around 2008.

References

External links
 NXT profile

1972 births
Living people
Members of the Australian House of Representatives for Mayo
Nick Xenophon Team members of the Parliament of Australia
21st-century Australian politicians
Women members of the Australian House of Representatives
21st-century Australian women politicians